Vytina (Vytína) is a mountain village and a former municipality in Arcadia, Peloponnese, Greece. It is considered a traditional settlement. Since the 2011 local government reform it is part of the municipality Gortynia, of which it is a municipal unit. The municipal unit has an area of 139.309 km2. The seat of the municipality was the village Vytina. The village is located at the foot of the mountain range Mainalo. The area produces marble, a variation called the Black of Vytina.
Vytina is 10 km east of Levidi, 15 km northeast of Dimitsana and 24 km northwest of Tripoli. The Greek National Road 74 (Tripoli - Pyrgos) passes through Vytina. The ancient Arcadian city Methydrion was located near Vytina.

Subdivisions
The municipal unit Vytina is subdivided into the following communities (constituent villages in brackets):
Elati
Kamenitsa (Kamenitsa, Karvouni)
Lasta (Lasta, Agridaki)
Magouliana (Magouliana, Pan)
Nymfasia
Pyrgaki (Pyrgaki, Methydrio)
Vytina (Vytina, Moni Panagias Kernitsis)

Population history

Climate
Due to its altitude and inland location, Vytina has a temperate climate with cold and snowy winters and warm summers with pleasant nights. Precipitation is abundant year round.

People
The father of the historian Constantine Paparrigopoulos, Dimitrios Paparrigopoulos was born in Vytina. Other important Vytiniots include the explorer Panayotis Potagos, the jurist Vasileios Oikonomidis, the provost marshal Ioannis Dimakopoulos, the iconographer Othon Giavopoulos and Kollias Vytiniotis.

See also
List of settlements in Arcadia
List of traditional settlements of Greece

References

External links
Official Tourist Guide of Vytina
Official Facebook page of Vytina
GTP - Vytina Municipality
Vytina Village
Black of Vytina
Black of Vytina - Marbleguide
Arcadia - Vytina

 
Populated places in Arcadia, Peloponnese